James Parke is the name of:

James Cecil Parke (1881–1946), tennis player, Australian Open winner 1912
James Parke, 1st Baron Wensleydale (1782–1868), English judge

See also
James Park (disambiguation)
James Parkes (disambiguation)
James Parks (disambiguation)